Mumtazabad is one of the oldest housing areas of east Multan in Punjab, Pakistan.

It is a well-developed and heavily populated area. The layout of the area is symmetrical, with a playground and Masjid on every block.

Notable places

BCG Chowk
Chowk where British Cotton Ginners were located, with their cotton ginning unit in the early 1940s. This is also the location of a Muslim public high school.

Several shops can be found in this area, as well as schools, polytechnics and other educational institutions.

Mian Faisal Mukhtar Park
The park is next to Mumtazabad Colony along Vehairi Road.

New Central Jail
Central jail multan is second big jail of Punjab & biggest jail of southern Punjab. it is situated behind Coca-Cola factory & 1 kilo meter from vehari road multan.

Post Office
Mumtazabad post office is located in the heart of Mumtazabad market Multan & the post code is 60600.

References

External links
 Multan's Best Information Portal! The biggest portal for Multani peoples,
 MultanToday.com Infotainment Portal of Multan, PK

Populated places in Multan District